Artyom Aleksandrovich Detyshev (born 21 July 1978) is a Russian former speed skater. He competed in three events at the 2006 Winter Olympics.

References

External links
 

1978 births
Living people
Russian male speed skaters
Olympic speed skaters of Russia
Speed skaters at the 2006 Winter Olympics
People from Angarsk
Sportspeople from Irkutsk Oblast